The KIIS Network is an Australian commercial radio stations owned and operated by the ARN. Formerly branded as the Mix Network, the network was rebranded as the KIIS Network in 2015 following the relaunch of KIIS 101.1 Melbourne. The KIIS Network is named after KIIS-FM, a Los Angeles-based radio station broadcast on the 
102.7 MHz FM band.

History 
In November 2014, ARN announced that from January 2015 a year after the demise of Melbourne radio station Mix 101.1 and Sydney radio station Mix 106.5, the Mix Network would be rebranded as the KIIS Network, with KIIS 101.1 and KIIS 106.5 and  alongside 97.3FM and Mix 102.3. The Brisbane and Adelaide stations retained their respective station names and music formats, but adopted the same branding themes inline with their KIIS sister stations. Mix 106.3 in Canberra is also a part of the network, but predominantly carries its own programming. An announcement of their branding being realigned to the rest of the KIIS Network was made in December 2019.

In December 2014, it was announced that Fairfax Media will merge with the Macquarie Radio Network and sell 96FM Perth to ARN. In January 2015, 96FM joined the KIIS Network.

In January 2022, it was announced that Brisbane's 97.3FM would rebrand to KIIS 97.3, following the acquisition of Grant Broadcasters by ARN.

Stations
As of 28 January 2022, the KIIS Network consists of fourteen radio stations. 

Mix 106.3 Canberra is a joint-venture with Southern Cross Austereo and programmed as part of the Triple M network. However, it does air some networked programming from joint venture partner ARN (The Christian O'Connell Show from Gold 104.3 Melbourne and Jonesy & Amanda from 101.7 WSFM Sydney).

Networked shows
Jase & Lauren At Night (except Perth) (from KIIS 101.1 Melbourne) 
Will & Woody (from KIIS 101.1 Melbourne)
The Kyle and Jackie O Hour of Power (from KIIS 106.5 Sydney)
The Pick Up (except Perth) (from KIIS 106.5 Sydney)
The Night Show with Mitch Churi (Melbourne and Sydney only) (from KIIS 106.5 Sydney)
Up Late with Zach & Dom (except Adelaide and Perth) (from KIIS 97.3 Brisbane)
Up Early with Zach & Dom (except Adelaide and Perth) (from KIIS 97.3 Brisbane)
First Play (Melbourne and Sydney only)
Planet Oz (Melbourne and Sydney only)
iHeartRadio Countdown (except Brisbane and Adelaide)
The Christian O'Connell Show (except Melbourne and Sydney) (from Gold 104.3 Melbourne) 
Life Uncut with Brittany Hockley and Laura Byrne (from KIIS 106.5 Sydney)
The Kris Fade Show (from Virgin Radio Dubai)

Digital radio 
The KIIS Network simulcasts each station in the network on DAB+ digital radio in their local markets. It also broadcasts in a joint venture with the Pure Gold Network, the adult contemporary-formatted Chemist Warehouse Remix. The KIIS Network stations are also available online via iHeartRadio.

On DAB+ in all markets (except Perth and Canberra), the KIIS Network operates a 90's pop digital station branded as KIIS 90s in Sydney and Melbourne. The station also operates in Brisbane and Adelaide under their respective FM brand names (i.e. Mix 102.3 90s in Adelaide), alongside an 80's pop station as well.

See also 
List of radio stations in Australia

References 

Australian Radio Network
Australian radio networks